Oleg Shatunov  (born 21 February 1967) is a former Russian male volleyball player. He was part of the Russia men's national volleyball team at the 1996 Summer Olympics. He played for Hiroshima Japan.

Clubs
 Hiroshima Japan (1994)

References

1967 births
Living people
Russian men's volleyball players
Place of birth missing (living people)
Volleyball players at the 1992 Summer Olympics
Volleyball players at the 1996 Summer Olympics
Olympic volleyball players of Russia
Olympic volleyball players of the Unified Team
20th-century Russian people
21st-century Russian people